Bohuslav Šťastný (born April 23, 1949 in Chotěboř, Czechoslovakia, now Czech Republic) is a retired professional ice hockey player who played in the Czechoslovak Extraliga. He played for HC Pardubice (now part of the Czech Extraliga).  He was a member of the Czechoslovak 1976 Canada Cup team, and was a silver medalist at the 1976 Winter Olympics, and a bronze medalist at the 1972 Winter Olympics.

References

External links 
 
 
 
 
 

1949 births
Living people
Czech ice hockey left wingers
Czechoslovak ice hockey left wingers
Olympic ice hockey players of Czechoslovakia
Olympic silver medalists for Czechoslovakia
Olympic medalists in ice hockey
Olympic bronze medalists for Czechoslovakia
Ice hockey players at the 1972 Winter Olympics
Ice hockey players at the 1976 Winter Olympics
Medalists at the 1972 Winter Olympics
Medalists at the 1976 Winter Olympics
HC Dynamo Pardubice players
People from Chotěboř
Sportspeople from the Vysočina Region
Czechoslovak expatriate sportspeople in West Germany
Expatriate ice hockey players in West Germany
Czechoslovak expatriate ice hockey people